The Lincoln Sport is a two-door roadster that was built by Lincoln in the early 1920s.

Sport